Ole Pohlmann (born 5 April 2001) is a German footballer who plays as a winger for Borussia Dortmund II in the 3. Liga.

Career

VfL Wolfsburg
A graduate of the club's youth academy, Pohlmann made his debut for VfL Wolfsburg II on 23 February 2020, coming on as a 74th-minute substitute for Jannis Heuer in a 4–2 victory over Eintracht Norderstedt. Prior to the 2020/21 season, he signed a new long-term deal with the club, with the intent to utilize him primarily with Wolfsburg II. However, he would make just eight appearances during the 2020/21 season, scoring once, before departing the club.

Borussia Dortmund II
In July 2021, Pohlmann signed with Borussia Dortmund II following their promotion to the 3. Liga. He made his debut for the club on the opening weekend of the season, coming on as a 78th-minute substitute for Richmond Tachie in a 2–1 victory over FSV Zwickau.

Career statistics

Club

References

External links
Ole Pohlmann at Bundesliga.com

2001 births
Living people
VfL Wolfsburg II players
Borussia Dortmund II players
Regionalliga players
3. Liga players
Germany youth international footballers
German footballers
Association football midfielders